Sami Mutanen is a Finnish professional ice hockey forward who currently plays for Ässät of the SM-liiga.

References

External links

Living people
Ässät players
1984 births
Finnish ice hockey forwards
People from Joensuu
Sportspeople from North Karelia